General elections were held in Romania between 4 and 8 November 1919. The Romanian National Party, which ran mostly unopposed in Transylvania, emerged as the largest party in Parliament, winning 169 of the 568 seats in the Chamber of Deputies and 76 of the 216 seats in the Senate. Though both the Socialist Party and People's League decided to boycott the elections, several of their candidates who had registered before the decision went on to win seats.

Results

Chamber of Deputies

Senate

References

External links
 Ciprian Stoleru, "Primele alegeri din România Mare, prima mare surpriză: Favoriţii, zdrobiţi la urna de vot", Adevărul, December 3, 2012

Parliamentary elections in Romania
Romania
1919 in Romania
Romania
Election and referendum articles with incomplete results
1919 elections in Romania